The Lions Gold Awards are annual accolades given by the Lions Club SOL of Mumbai to recognise excellence in the Hindi films and television industry.

Winners

Television awards

2009

 Best Show – Sapna Babul Ka... Bidaai
 Best TV Actor - Sharad Malhotra for Banoo Main Teri Dulhann
 Best TV Actress - Sara Khan for Sapna Babul Ka... Bidaai
 Best Actor Comedy - Deven Bhojani for Baa Bahoo Aur Baby
 Best Actress Comedy - Vaishali Thakkar for Baa Bahoo Aur Baby
 Best Supporting Actor - Alok Nath for Sapna Babul Ka... Bidaai
 Best Supporting Actress - Smita Bansal for Balika Vadhu
 Best Negative Actor - Jatin Shah for Kasturi
 Best Negative Actress - Kamya Panjabi for Banoo Main Teri Dulhann

2010
 Best Show – Pavitra Rishta
 Best Actor – Sushant Singh Rajput for Pavitra Rishta
 Best Actress - Ratan Rajput for Agle Janam Mohe Bitiya Hi Kijo
 Best Actor Comedy – Dilip Joshi for Taarak Mehta Ka Ooltah Chashmah
 Best Actress Comedy - Disha Vakani for Taarak Mehta Ka Ooltah Chashmah
 Best Supporting Actor - Ayub Khan for Uttaran
 Best Supporting Actress - Savita Prabhune for Pavitra Rishta
 Best Negative Actor - Sharad Kelkar for Bairi Piya
 Best Negative Actress - Usha Nadkarni for Pavitra Rishta

2011
 Favorite Serial- Sasural Genda Phool 
 Favorite Actor In Television Serial - Female - Ankita Lokhande (Pavitra Rishta)
 Favorite Actor In A Television Serial- Male - Sushant Singh Rajput (Pavitra Rishta)
 Favorite Actor In Negative Role (Female)- Television - Swati Anand (Pavitra Rishta)
 Favorite Actor In Negative Role (Male)- Television - Yashpal Sharma (Mera Naam Karegi Roshan)
 Favorite Actor In Supporting Role- Female – Television - Supriya Pilgaonkar (Sasural Genda Phool)
 Favorite Actor In Supporting Role- Male – Television - Anoop Soni (Balika Vadhu)
 Favorite Promising Actor - Male – Television - Mishal Raheja (Laagi Tujhse Lagan)
 Favorite Promising Actor - Female – Television - Mahii Vij (Laagi Tujhse Lagan)
 Favorite Khatron Ke Khiladi- Shabbir Ahluwalia
 Favorite Actor In A Comic Role- Female – Television - Disha Vakani (Taarak Mehta Ka Ooltah Chashmah)
 Favorite Actor In A Comic Role- Male – Television - Dilip Joshi (Taarak Mehta Ka Ooltah Chashmah)

2012
 Best Show– Bade Acche Lagte Hain
 Best Actor– Ram Kapoor for Bade Acche Lagte Hain
 Best Actress– Sakshi Tanwar for Bade Acche Lagte Hain

2013
 Favourite Male Child Actor - Television – Amey Pandya
 Favourite Female Child Actor - Television – Amrita Mukherjee (Bade Achhe Lagte Hain)
 Favourite New face - Television – Annie Gill (Anamika)
 Favourite Comeback - Television – Aamna Sharif (Hongey Judaa Na Hum)
 Favourite Jodi - Television – Sharad Kelkar and Kritika Kamra (Kuch Toh Log Kahenge)
 Favourite Actress (Critics) - Television – Pratyusha Banerjee (Balika Vadhu)
 Favourite Actor (Critics) - Television – Samir Kochhar (Bade Achhe Lagte Hain)
 Favourite Actress in Supporting Role - Television – Renuka Israni (Bade Achhe Lagte Hain)
 Favourite Comedienne - Television – Bharti Singh (Comedy Circus)
 Favourite Comedian - Television – Krushna Abhishek (Comedy Circus)
 Favourite Television Anchor – Anoop Soni (Crime Patrol)
 Favourite Most Enterprising Face - Television – Rashami Desai
 Favourite Female Reality Show Contestant – Urvashi Dholakia (Bigg Boss 6)
 Favourite Male Reality Show Contestant – Rajeev Paul (Bigg Boss 6)
 Favourite Best Actress on Television – Sakshi Tanwar (Bade Achhe Lagte Hain)
 Favourite Best Actor on Television – Ram Kapoor for (Bade Achhe Lagte Hain
 Favourite Films and Television Production House – Ekta Kapoor

2014
 Best Show – Diya Aur Baati Hum
 Best Supporting Actress— Shafaq Naaz

2015
 Best Child Actor– Shivansh Kotia for Yeh Rishta Kya Kehlata Hai
 Best Show– Ekta Kapoor for Ye Hai Mohabbatein
 Best Comeback Male– Eijaz Khan
 Best Comeback Female– Pallavi Kulkarni for Itna Karo Na Mujhe Pyaar
 Best Direction – Sameer Kulkarni for Kumkum Bhagya
 Best Jodi – Shabbir Ahluwalia & Sriti Jha for Kumkum Bhagya
 Best Supporting Actor- Arjit Taneja for Kumkum Bhagya
 Best Supporting Actress – Mrunal Thakur for Kumkum Bhagya
 Best Actor  Gautam Rode for Saraswatichandra
 Best Actress  Divyanka Tripathi for Ye Hai Mohabbatein
 Best Anchor Male  Rithvik Dhanjani
 Best Anchor Female  Asha Negi

2016
 Best Actor– Mohammed Iqbal Khan
 Best Actress– Mona Singh
 Popular Actor – Gautam Rode
 Best Supporting Actress– Lata Sabharwal
 Best Actress In Negative Role– Adaa Khan
 Best Show– Naagin
 Lions Favourite Versatile Actress- Jennifer Winget

2017 
 Best Actor—Kushal Tandon (Beyhadh)
 Best Actress— Jennifer Winget (Beyhadh)
 Best Jodi Popular— Shaheer Sheikh and Erica Fernandes (Kuch Rang Pyar Ke Aise Bhi)
 Best Jodi Critics— Namik Paul and Nikita Dutta (Ek Duje Ke Vaaste)
 Best Supporting Actor— Mushtaq Khan (Kuch Rang Pyar Ke Aise Bhi)
 Best Supporting Actress— Supriya Pilgaonkar (Kuch Rang Pyar Ke Aise Bhi)
 Best Actor Comedy— Dilip Joshi (Taarak Mehta Ka Ooltah Chashmah)
 Best Actress Comedy— Disha Vakani (Taarak Mehta Ka Ooltah Chashmah)
Best Actor In A Negative Role— Rajesh Khattar (Beyhadh)
 Best Child Actor— Kartikey Malviya (Shani)
 Best Anchor— Manish Paul

2018 

Favourite Actor – Laksh Lalwani (Porus)
Favourite Actress – Nikita Dutta (Haasil)
Favourite Actor Critics – Vatsal Seth (Haasil)
Favourite Actress Critics – Rati Pandey (Porus)
Favourite Comedian – Sanket Bhosale
Favourite Comediene – Sugandha Mishra
Favourite Actor in Negative Role – Jiten Lalwani (Pehredaar Piya Ki)
Favourite Actress in Negative Role – Kamya Panjabi (Shakti - Astitva Ke Ehsaas Ki)
Favourite Supporting Actor Male – Amar Upadhyay (Saath Nibhaana Saathiya)
Favourite Supporting Actor Female – Rajeshwari Sachdev (Peshwa Bajirao)
Favourite Krishna – Vishal Jethwa (Chakradhari Ajay Krishna)
Favourite “Long Term Prospect on Television” – Mahima Makwana (Rishton Ka Chakravyuh)
Favorite Anchor– Raghav Juyal (Dance Plus)
Favourite Comic Character Female – Shubhangi Atre (Bhabhi Ji Ghar Par Hai)
Favourite Comic Character Male – Maninder Singh (Kya Haal, Mr. Panchal)

2019 

Best Actor (Popular): Harshad Chopda for Bepannah
Best Actress (Popular): Jennifer Winget for Bepannah
Best Actor (Jury): Mohit Malik for Kullfi Kumarr Bajewala
Best Actress (Jury): Surbhi Chandna for Ishqbaaaz
Best Supporting Actor (Male): Rajesh Khattar for Bepannah
Most Stylish Personality: Mouni Roy
Most Versatile Icon: Sharad Malhotra
Best Reality Icon: Dipika Kakar for Bigg Boss 12
Best TV Personality: Sreesanth for Bigg Boss 12 
 Best Child Artist: Aakriti Sharma for Kullfi Kumarr Bajewala
 Best Stylish TV Personality: Hina Khan

2020 

 Best Actor - Shaheer Sheikh for Yeh Rishtey Hain Pyaar Ke
 Best Actress - Shraddha Arya for Kundali Bhagya
 Best TV Show - Ekta Kapoor for Kundali Bhagya
 Best Supporting Actor - Ritvik Arora for Yeh Rishtey Hain Pyaar Ke
 Best Supporting Actress - Kaveri Priyam for Yeh Rishtey Hain Pyaar Ke
 TV Icon of the Year (Male) - Dheeraj Dhoopar
 TV Icon of the Year (Female) - Jennifer Winget

Film awards

2013
 Best Actor in a Leading Role Shahrukh Khan for Jab Tak Hai Jaan
 Best Actress in a Leading Role Priyanka Chopra for Barfi
 Best Actor (Critics) Hrithik Roshan for Agneepath
 Best Actress (Critics) Vidya Balan for Kahaani
 Favorite Debut (Male) Varun Dhawan for Student Of The Year
 Favorite Debut (Female) Alia Bhatt for Student Of The Year
 Best Actor in Comic Role Neeraj Vora for Bol Bachchan
 Best Actor in a Negative Role Nawazuddin Siddiqui for Gangs of Wasseypur
 Best Director Anurag Basu for Barfi

2018

 Best Actor Popular (For selfless contribution towards nation, through social message in films)— Akshay Kumar
 Blockbuster Director Of The Year (For Golmaal Again)—Rohit Shetty
 Favourite Powerful Performance With Social Impact (For Maatr)– Raveena Tandon
 Best Supporting Actor (Secret Superstar)– Meher Vij
 Favourite Best Film Producer (Toilet: Ek Prem Katha)– Prerna Arora, KriArj Entertainment
 Favourite Singing Sensation Of The Year– Palak Muchhal
 Best Actor (Badrinath Ki Dulhania)–Varun Dhawan
 Tribute to Vinod Khanna–Shabana Azmi
 Favourite Upcoming Singer for Desi Love– Renu Sharma

2019
 Best Actor Par Excellence - Varun Dhawan for October
 Best Stellar Performance - Ranveer Singh for Padmaavat and Simmba
 Best Actor in a Comic Role (Female) - Neena Gupta for Badhaai Ho
 Best Actor in a Comic Role (Male) - Aparshakti Khurana for Stree
 Best Actor in a Supporting Role - Vicky Kaushal for Sanju
 Best Debut Female - Janhvi Kapoor for Dhadak
 Best Debut Male - Aayush Sharma for Loveyatri
 Charismatic Performer Of The Year - Elli Avram
 Singer Of The Decade- Palak Muchhal

2020

2022

Others awards
Favourite “Swachh Bharat Crusader” – Advocate Afroz Shah
Favourite “Real Estate Consultants of the Year” – M/S Sai Estate Consultants
Favourite upcoming “Outdoor Advertising Agency” – M/S Simca Advertising
Favourite Lionistic Icon in India –Pradeep Rathi
Favourite “Early Childhood Training Institute” –Titli Early Childhood Training Institute
Favourite “Social Media, Advertising & Marketing Agency” – M/S S R Creation
Favourite“ Commoner turned Celebrity” –Manveer Gurjar
Favourite Radio Jockey – Satish Kaushik

References

External links

Film awards
Indian film awards